Maurice Hallé (26 February 1906 – 5 April 1991) was a Liberal party member of the House of Commons of Canada. Born in Sherbrooke, Quebec, he was an executive secretary and farmer by career.

Hallé attended Saint-Hyacinthe Seminary, then Université de Montréal. He also served in the military and attained a rank of Lieutenant-Colonel.

He was first elected to Parliament at the Brome—Missisquoi riding in the 1940 general election and re-elected in 1945 federal election. Hallé did not seek re-election in 1949 and left federal politics, but was an unsuccessful candidate at Brome—Missisquoi in the 1958 election.

References

External links
 

1906 births
1991 deaths
Canadian farmers
Liberal Party of Canada MPs
Members of the House of Commons of Canada from Quebec
Politicians from Sherbrooke
Université de Montréal alumni